Oropesa is a Spanish town in the province of Toledo. The town of 2,872 is famous for its castle, which was built in 1402, turned into a Parador Nacional in 1930. The castle was formerly the residence of the Toledo family of nobles. This includes Francisco de Toledo, Count of Oropesa, who became the Viceroy of Peru.

The town has a yearly celebration in April called "Jornadas Medievales", or "Medieval Days", which plays off the presence of the Castle in Oropesa.

References

See also
Municipal Website (in Spanish)

Municipalities in the Province of Toledo